Steven Lee Cropper (born October 21, 1941), sometimes known as "The Colonel", is an American guitarist, songwriter and record producer. He is the guitarist of the Stax Records house band, Booker T. & the M.G.'s, which backed artists such as Otis Redding, Sam & Dave, Carla Thomas, Rufus Thomas and Johnnie Taylor. He also acted as the producer of many of these records. He was later a member of the Blues Brothers band. Rolling Stone magazine ranked him 36th on its list of the 100 greatest guitarists of all time, while he has won two Grammy Awards from his seven nominations.

Early life
Born on a farm near Willow Springs, Missouri, Cropper lived in the nearby towns of Dora and West Plains before moving with his family to Memphis at age nine. In Memphis, he was exposed to black church music, which, he said, "blew me away". Cropper acquired his first guitar via mail order at age 14.

He loved the Five Royals and he admired guitarists including Tal Farlow, Chuck Berry, Jimmy Reed, Chet Atkins, Lowman Pauling of the Five Royales and Billy Butler of the Bill Doggett band.

Career
Cropper and guitarist Charlie Freeman formed the Royal Spades, who eventually became the Mar-Keys. The name referred to the marquee outside Stax studios, known as Satellite Records at the time. Eventually, the Mar-Keys began playing on sessions and had a hit single of their own with  "Last Night" in 1961.

Besides being impressed with the young guitarist's playing, Stax Records president Jim Stewart saw professionalism and maturity beyond Cropper's years. When American Records founder Chips Moman left Stax, Cropper became the company's A&R man. He became a founding member of the Stax house band Booker T. & the M.G.'s, along with Hammond organ player Booker T. Jones, bassist Lewie Steinberg (who was replaced by Donald "Duck" Dunn soon thereafter) and drummer Al Jackson Jr. As a house guitarist, he played on many recordings such as "(Sittin' On) the Dock of the Bay", co-written with and performed by Otis Redding and Sam & Dave's "Soul Man" on which he was mentioned by name.  When Cropper played on the song's remake by the Blues Brothers, lead singer John Belushi again mentioned Cropper. On the early Stax recordings, Cropper is known to have played a 1956 Fender Esquire and later used a blonde Fender Telecaster.

At this time, Cropper's fame was not limited to the United States. The Beatles favored Cropper's playing, and his production on Otis Redding records. John Lennon and Paul McCartney made tentative plans to record in Memphis and to work with the guitarist. However Brian Epstein canceled the sessions, citing security problems. Regarding this period, Rob Bowman, in his book Soulsville U.S.A.: The Story of Stax Records, quoted Booker T. Jones as saying:

Along with influential work with Booker T & The MG's, Cropper co-wrote "Knock on Wood" with Eddie Floyd, "In the Midnight Hour" with Wilson Pickett and "(Sittin' On) The Dock of the Bay" with Otis Redding. In 1969, Cropper released his first solo album, With a Little Help From My Friends.

When Cropper left Stax in the fall of 1970, the label lost one of its most successful producers and songwriters. Cropper then set up TMI Studios with Jerry Williams and former Mar-Key Ronnie Stoots. He worked with many musicians including Tower of Power, Rod Stewart, John Prine, José Feliciano, The Jeff Beck Group, Ringo Starr and John Lennon.

By 1975, Cropper had moved to Los Angeles and along with Jones, Jackson and Dunn, reformed Booker T. & the M.G.'s. Jackson, whom Cropper called "the greatest drummer to ever walk the Earth," was murdered in his Memphis home before the group could make their comeback. In 1978, Cropper and Dunn became members of Levon Helm's RCO All-Stars and then went on to figure prominently in the Blues Brothers Band with drummer Willie Hall. This led to two albums, appearances in the movies Blues Brothers and Blues Brothers 2000, and the movies' soundtracks. Cropper also re-recorded "(Sittin' On) The Dock of the Bay" (1979) for Sammy Hagar. Cropper lived in Los Angeles for the next thirteen years before moving to Nashville and reuniting with the Blues Brothers Band in 1988.

Cropper has a cameo in the "Weird Al" Yankovic mockumentary The Compleat Al (1985), where he plays a bit of "Soul Man" in an unsuccessful attempt to join Al's band.

In 1991 Cropper played on two separate nights of the Expo '92 Guitar Legends concerts as part of the celebration of Seville hosting the 1992 Expo exhibition. The concerts over five nights included some of the world's best guitarists such as Cropper, BB King, Robert Cray, Eric Clapton, Bo Diddley, Brian May, Albert Colin's, Bob Dylan, Jo Satriani, and Steve Vai to name but a few. 

In 1992, Booker T. & the M.G.'s were inducted into the Rock and Roll Hall of Fame and Cropper appeared with a new line-up of the group for the Bob Dylan 30th Anniversary concert, in October 1992 at Madison Square Garden, performing songs by and backing Dylan, Eric Clapton, George Harrison, Tom Petty, Johnny Cash, Chrissie Hynde, Sinéad O'Connor, Stevie Wonder and Neil Young. The concert was recorded and later released as The 30th Anniversary Concert Celebration (1993). Young later recruited this line up of Booker T. and the M.G's to tour with him and record as his studio band.

In 1996, Cropper was named "the greatest living guitar player" by Britain's Mojo magazine. When asked what he thought of Cropper, the guitarist Keith Richards said, "Perfect, man." In February 1998, Cropper released The Interview - Play It, Steve! which included some of soul music's most enduring songs. The album title came from the "shout" of the title phrase by Moore on Sam & Dave's "Soul Man" and later by John Belushi (with the Blues Brothers).

In June 2004, Cropper appeared with Dunn and Jones as the backing band for Eric Clapton's Crossroads Guitar Festival, held at the Cotton Bowl in Dallas. Others who appeared included Joe Walsh and David Hidalgo. On June 9, 2005, Cropper was inducted into the Songwriters Hall of Fame.

He co-produced The Memphis Album (2007), recorded by Australian soul singer Guy Sebastian. Cropper also played guitar on the subsequent promotional tour, which was recorded and released two years later as The Memphis Tour. On March 2, 2008, Cropper and Sebastian were guests on the Vega Sunday Session with host Mark Gable from the rock band the Choirboys. On July 29, 2008, Cropper and Felix Cavaliere released the album Nudge It Up A Notch. In August 2008, Cropper appeared at the Rhythm Festival alongside the Animals.

On November 12, 2009, EMP/SFM presented Cropper with their "Founders Award". On October 17, 2010, Cropper was inducted into the Nashville Songwriters Hall of Fame.

On August 9, 2011, Cropper released the album Dedicated which was his tribute to the "5" Royales. In 2013 he was a special guest at selected concerts as part of Peter Frampton's Guitar Circus Tour, including the first performance which featured Frampton, Robert Cray and Vince Gill.

In April 2013, Cropper appeared with Jones, Matt "Guitar" Murphy, as well as Booker T. & the MG's at Eric Clapton's 4th Crossroads Guitar Festival at Madison Square Garden in New York City.

In November 2021, Cropper's Fire It Up was nominated for a Grammy Award in the Best Contemporary Blues Album category.

On August 25, 2022, Cropper appeared on stage with Ted Nugent at Graceland soundstage where they played In The Midnight Hour together.

Awards and nominations
{| class="wikitable Sortable"
|-
! Year
! Ceremony
! Category
! Nominated work
! Result
! Ref.
|-
|1967
|Grammy Awards
|Best Rhythm and Blues Group Recording, Vocal or Instrumental
|Hip Hug-Her
|
|style="text-align:center;"|
|-
|1967
|Grammy Awards
|Best Rhythm and Blues Recording
|Try A Little Tenderness
|
|style="text-align:center;"|
|-
|1968
|Grammy Awards
|Best Rhythm and Blues Song
|(Sittin' On) The Dock Of The Bay
|
|style="text-align:center;"|
|-
|1994
|Grammy Awards
|Best Pop Instrumental Performance
|Cruisin|
|style="text-align:center;"|
|-
|1995
|Grammy Awards
|Best R&B Performance By A Duo Or Group With Vocal
|A Change Is Gonna Come
|
|style="text-align:center;"|
|-
|2008
|Grammy Awards
|Best Pop Instrumental Performance
|Love Appetite
|
|style="text-align:center;"|
|-
|2022
|Grammy Awards
|Best Contemporary Blues Album
|Fire It Up
|
|style="text-align:center;"|
|}

Discography
1969: With a Little Help from My Friends
1969: Jammed Together (with Albert King and Pops Staples)
1971: This Is ... Steve Cropper & His Friends (compilation of With a Little Help from My Friends and Jammed Together, released in France only)
1981: Playin' My Thang
1982: Night After Night
1998: The Interview – Play It, Steve!
2008: Nudge It Up A Notch (with Felix Cavaliere)
2010: Midnight Flyer (with Felix Cavaliere)
2011: Dedicated – A Salute to the 5 Royales
2017: Steve Cropper, Lou Marini and the Original Blues Brothers Band – The Last Shade of Blue Before Black
2018: Telemasters (with Arlen Roth)
2021: Fire It Up

 Collaborations With Booker T. & the M.G.'s Green Onions (Stax Records, 1962)
 Soul Dressing (Stax Records, 1965)
 And Now! (Stax Records, 1966)
 In the Christmas Spirit (Stax Records, 1966)
 Hip Hug-Her (Stax Records, 1967)
 Doin' Our Thing (Stax Records, 1968)
 Soul Limbo (Stax Records, 1968)
 UpTight (Stax Records, 1969)
 The Booker T. Set (Stax Records, 1969)
 McLemore Avenue (Stax Records, 1970)
 Melting Pot (Stax Records, 1971)
 Universal Language (Asylum Records, 1977)
 That's the Way It Should Be (Columbia Records, 1994)With Otis Redding Pain in My Heart (Atco Records, 1964)
 The Great Otis Redding Sings Soul Ballads (Atco Records, 1965)
 Otis Blue: Otis Redding Sings Soul (Stax Records, 1965)
 The Soul Album (Stax Records, 1966)
 Complete & Unbelievable: The Otis Redding Dictionary of Soul (Stax Records, 1966)
 King & Queen (Stax Records, 1967)
 The Dock of the Bay (Stax Records, 1968)With Levon Helm Levon Helm & the RCO All-Stars (ABC Records, 1977)
 Levon Helm (ABC Records, 1978)With Wynonna Judd Tell Me Why (Curb Records, 1993)With Rod Stewart Atlantic Crossing (Warner Bros. Records, 1975)
 A Night on the Town (Warner Bros. Records, 1976)
 Foot Loose & Fancy Free (Warner Bros. Records, 1977)
 Every Beat of My Heart (Warner Bros. Records, 1986)With Albert King Born Under a Bad Sign (Stax Records, 1967)
 Years Gone By (Stax Records, 1969)With Livingston Taylor Man's Best Friend (Epic Records, 1980)With Nigel Olsson Nigel Olsson (The Rocket Record Company, 1975)With Richie Havens The End of the Beginning (A&M Records, 1976)With A. J. Croce Just Like Medicine (Compass Records, 2017)With Sanford & Townsend Duo-Glide (Warner Bros. Records, 1977)With Ringo Starr Ringo (Apple Records, 1973)
 Goodnight Vienna (Apple Records, 1974)
 Vertical Man (Mercury Records, 1998)With Jimmy Barnes Soul Searchin' (Liberation Music, 2016)With Chris Hillman Slippin' Away (Asylum Records, 1976)With Dale Watson Jukebox Fury (Cleopatra Records, 2022)With Yvonne Elliman Rising Sun (RSO Records, 1975)
 Night Flight (RSO Records, 1978)
 Yvonne (RSO Records, 1979)With Ronnie Baker Brooks Times Have Changed (Provogue Records, 2017)With Patti Dahlstrom Your Place or Mine (20th Century Records, 1975)With Guy Sebastian The Memphis Album (Sony BMG, 2007)With Billy Burnette Try Me (Curb, 1985)With Frank Black Honeycomb (Cooking Vinyl, 2005)
 Fast Man Raider Man (Cooking Vinyl, 2006)With David Clayton-Thomas David Clayton-Thomas (Columbia Records, 1972)With Craig Morgan Craig Morgan (Atlantic Records, 2000)With Cyndi Grecco Making Our Dreams Come True (Private Stock Records, 1976)With John Oates 1000 Miles of Life (Phunk Shui Records, 2008)With Delaney & Bonnie Home (Stax Records, 1969)
 D&B Together (Columbia Records, 1972)With The Manhattan Transfer Pastiche (Atlantic, 1978)With Mavis Staples Mavis Staples (Volt Records, 1969)
 Only for the Lonely (Volt Records, 1970)With Leon Russell Will O' the Wisp (Shelter Records, 1975)With Peter Frampton Where I Should Be (A&M Records, 1979)With Art Garfunkel Breakaway (Columbia Records, 1975)With Mickey Thomas As Long as You Love Me (MCA Records, 1977)With William Bell The Soul of a Bell (Stax Records, 1967)
 Bound to Happen (Stax Records, 1969)With Cate Brothers Cate Bros. (Asylum Records, 1975)
 In One Eye and Out the Order (Asylum Records, 1976)With Brian Cadd White On White (Capitol Records, 1976)With Roy Orbison Mystery Girl (Virgin Records, 1989)With Al Kooper White Chocolate (Sony Records, 2008)With Harry Nilsson Flash Harry (Mercury Records, 1980)With Neil Sedaka The Hungry Years (The Rocket Record Company, 1975)
 Steppin' Out (Polydor Records, 1976)With Dolly Parton Heartbreak Express (RCA Records, 1982)With Richie Furay I've Got a Reason (Asylum Records, 1976)With Aaron Neville The Tattoeed Heart (A&M Records, 1995)With The Manhattan Transfer Pastiche (Atlantic Records, 1978)With Rebecca Lynn Howard Rebecca Lynn Howard (Universal Music, 2000)With José Feliciano Compartments (RCA Victor, 1973)
 For My Love... Mother Music (RCA Victor, 1974)With Barbi Benton Something New (Polydor Records, 1976)With Paul Shaffer Coast to Coast (Capitol Records, 1989)With Eddie Floyd Knock on Wood (Stax Records, 1967)
 Down to Earth (Stax Records, 1971)With Carla Thomas Memphis Queen (Stax Records, 1969)With John Lennon Rock 'n' Roll (Apple Records, 1975)With Leo Sayer Here (Chrysalis Records, 1979)With Etta James Seven Year Itch (Island Records, 1988)
 The Right Time (Elektra Records, 1992)With Wilson Pickett In the Midnight Hour (Atlantic Records, 1965)
 The Exciting Wilson Pickett (Atlantic Records, 1966)With John Prine Common Sense (Atlantic Records, 1975)With Stephen Bishop Bish (ABC Records, 1978)With Michel Polnareff Michel Polnareff (Atlantic Records, 1975)With Jimmy Buffett Hot Water (MCA Records, 1988)With Wendy Waldman The Main Refrain (Warner Bros. Records, 1976)With Paul Simon'''
 Songs from The Capeman (Warner Bros. Records, 1997)

Filmography
1980: The Blues Brothers as himself
1988: Satisfaction as Sal
1999: Blues Brothers 2000 as himself
2008: Be Kind Rewind'' as himself

References

External links
 
 The official Steve Cropper MySpace page
 Steve Cropper Interview NAMM Oral History Library (2015)
 

1941 births
Living people
American blues guitarists
American soul guitarists
American male guitarists
American session musicians
Grammy Award winners
Lead guitarists
Guitarists from Missouri
People from Ozark County, Missouri
Booker T. & the M.G.'s members
The Blues Brothers members
American rock guitarists
American rhythm and blues guitarists
Guitarists from Tennessee
Songwriters from Tennessee
20th-century American guitarists